The Beast of the East is the largest college rugby tournament in the world. Beast of the East is held in April of each year. In 2022, the tournament added sevens competitions to the schedule in response to the increase of teams playing rugby sevens in the spring season. In 2010, the 27th annual tournament, 84 college rugby teams participated in five divisions. The tournament is hosted by Providence Rugby Football Club on six rugby fields at The Glen in Portsmouth, Rhode Island.

Past Champions 
2018
 Women's Division 1: Vassar College def. UConn 15-12
 Women's Division 2: UAlbany def. Marist College 17-5
 Women's Division 3: University of New Haven def UMass Dartmouth 34-0
 Men's Division 1: Bishop's University def. UMass Amherst 13-10
 Men's Division 2: Plymouth State University def. Sacred Heart University 17-7
 Men's Division 3: UMaine Farmington def. UMass Dartmouth 28-5
2017
Women's Division 1: Vassar College
Women's Division 2: Roger Williams University
Women's Division 3: University of Maine Orono def. University of Connecticut 17-12 (OT)
Men's Division 1: University of Connecticut
Men's Division 2: Salve Regina
Men's Division 3: University of Maine Orono def. University of New Haven 24-0
2016
Women's Division 1: University of Connecticut 
Men's Division 1: University of Massachusetts- Amherst
Women's Division 2: Vassar College
Men's Division 2: Roger Williams University
Women's Division 3: Roger Williams University
2015
Men's Division 3: University of Maine Orono def. Colby College 21-3
Women's Division 3: Roger Williams University
2014
Men's Division 1: University of Massachusetts Amherst def. Providence College 16-3
Men's Division 2: University of Massachusetts Amherst B side def. Salve Regina University 12-5
 Women's Division 3: Middlebury College def. Plymouth State
2013
Men's Division 1: University of Massachusetts Amherst def. United States Merchant Marine Academy 11-10
2012
Men's Division 1: Iona College def. 
Men's Division 2:  Sacred Heart University def. Massachusetts Maritime Academy 20-0
Women's Division 1: Northeastern University def. Boston College
2011
Men's Division 1: Salve Regina University def. Syracuse University 12-5
Men's Division 2: Iona College def. Providence College 
Women's Division 1: 
Women's Division 2:
Women's Division 3: Smith College def. College of the Holy Cross 20-0

2010
Men's Division 1: Northeastern University def. Brown University 17-0
Men's Division 2: Southern Connecticut State University def. Salve Regina University 21-0
Women's Division 1: Dartmouth College def. Princeton University 10-0
Women's Division 2: Radcliffe College def. Marist
Women's Division 3: MIT def. College of the Holy Cross

2009
Men's Division 1: University of Connecticut
Men's Division 2: Providence College
Women's Division 1: Vassar College def. Syracuse University 31-0
Women's Division 2: Bryant University
Women's Division 3: College of the Holy Cross

2008 - 25th Annual Tournament
Division 1 Men: Bentley University def. URI 14-5
Division 2 Men: Salisbury State University def. Bryant University
Division 2 Women: Providence College def. Rutgers University
Division 3 Women: Bryant University def. Roger Williams University

2007
Men's Division 1: United States Merchant Marine Academy King's Point def. Northeastern University 3-0
Men's Division 2: Vassar College def. University of Maine at Farmington 22-10
Women's Division 2: Vassar College def. University of New Hampshire 19-0
Women's Division 3: University of Rhode Island def. College of the Holy Cross

External links
Official website
Providence Rugby Football Club

College rugby union competitions in the United States